Moradluy-e Olya (also Romanized as Morādlūy-e ‘Olyā; also known as Morādlū-ye Bālā and Morādlū-ye ‘Olyā) is a village in Chaybasar-e Sharqi Rural District, in the Central District of Poldasht County, West Azerbaijan Province, Iran. At the 2006 census, its population was 147, in 31 families.

References 

Populated places in Poldasht County